The Greater Awyu or Digul River languages, known in earlier classifications with more limited scope as Awyu–Dumut (Awyu–Ndumut), are a family of perhaps a dozen Trans–New Guinea languages spoken in eastern West Papua in the region of the Digul River. Six of the languages are sufficiently attested for a basic description; it is not clear how many of the additional names (in parentheses below) may be separate languages.

History
The Awyu (pronounced like English Ow you) and Awyu–Dumut families were identified by Peter Drabbe in the 1950s.

Voorhoeve included them in his proposed Central and South New Guinea group.  As part of Central and South New Guinea, they form part of the original proposal for Trans–New Guinea.

Classification
The classification below is based on Usher and de Vries et al. (2012), who used morphological innovations to determine relatedness, which can be obscured by lexical loanwords.

 Sawi (Sawuy)
Awyu–Dumut (Central Digul River)
Awyu languages: Aghu (Jair), Shiaxa (Jenimu, Edera), Pisa (Asuwe)
Ndeiram–Ndumut
 Dumut (Wambon) branch: Mandobo (Kaeti, Dumut), Wambon
Ndeiram River: Kombai–Wanggom
North Digul River
Awbono-Bayono
Becking–Dawi
Dawi River: Komyandaret, Tsaukambo
Becking River: Korowai

Sawi is classified on pronominal data, as the morphological data used for the rest of the family is not available.

Pawley and Hammarström (2018) exclude Awbono-Bayono, treating it as a separate family.

Various other languages can be found in the literature. Ario (Sumagaxe) is listed in Wurm, Foley, etc., but not in the University of Amsterdam survey and has been dropped by Ethnologue. Ethnologue lists a 'Central Awyu', but this is not attested as a distinct language (U. Amsterdam). In general, the names in Ethnologue are quite confused, and older editions speak of names from Wurm (1982), such as Mapi, Kia, Upper Digul, Upper Kaeme, which are names of language surveys along the rivers of those names, and may actually refer to Ok languages rather than to Awyu.

van den Heuvel & Fedden (2014) argue that Greater Awyu and Greater Ok are not genetically related, but that their similarities are due to intensive contact.

Reconstruction

Phonemes
Usher (2020) reconstructs "perhaps" 15 consonants and 8 vowels, as follows:

{| 
| m || n ||  ||  || 
|-
| p || t || s || k || kʷ
|-
| mb || nd || ndz || ng || ngʷ
|-
| w || ɾ || j ||  || 
|}

{| 
|i|| ||u
|-
|e|| ||o
|-
|ɛ|| ||ɔ
|-
| ||a||ɒ
|}

Pronouns
Usher (2020) reconstructs the pronouns as:
{| 
! !!sg!!pl
|-
!1
|*nup||
|-
!2
|*ngup||*ngip
|-
!3
|
|
|}

Ross (2005) reconstructs the pronouns of the Awyu–Dumut branch as follows:

{|
! !!sg!!pl
|-
!1
|*nu-p||*na-gu-p
|-
!2
|*gu-p||*ga-gu-p
|-
!3
|*e-p, *[n]ege-p, *yu-p||*ya-gu-p
|}

The suffix *-p and the change of the final TNG *a vowel to *u do not appear in the possessive pronouns: *na, *ga, *ya/wa, *na-ga, *ga-ga, *ya-ga.

Basic vocabulary

Healey (1970) and Voorhoeve (2000)
The following selected reconstructions of Proto-Awyu-Dumut, Proto-Awyu, and Proto-Dumut by Voorhoeve are from Healey (1970) and Voorhoeve (2000), as cited in the Trans-New Guinea database:

{| class="wikitable sortable"
! gloss !! Proto-Awyu-Dumut !! Proto-Awyu !! Proto-Dumut
|-
! head
| *kɑibɑn; *xaiban || *xaiban; *xɑibɑn || *kɑbiɑn; *kebian
|-
! hair
| *möxö; *muk; *ron || *mox; *mux; *ron || *mökö-ron; *muk; *ron
|-
! ear
| *turun || *turun || *turutop; *turu=top
|-
! eye
| *kerop || *kero || *kerop
|-
! nose
| *togut ||  || *togut
|-
! tongue
| *fɔgat; *fɔgɛt; *pogɑt || *fagɛ; *fɑge || *ogat; *pɑgɑt
|-
! louse
| *gut || *go; *gu; *ɑgu || *gut
|-
! dog
| *angay; *ɑgɑi; *set || *sɛ; *(y)ange; *(y)angi; *yɑgi || *agay; *ɑgɑi; *tit
|-
! pig
| *wi || *wi || *uy
|-
! bird
| *yet || *yi || *yet
|-
! egg
| *wɑidin || *mugo || *wɑdin
|-
! blood
| *gom || *gon || *gom
|-
! bone
|  || *bogi || *mit
|-
! skin
| *kɑt; *xa(t) || *xɑ; *xa || *kotay; *kɑtɑy
|-
! breast
| *ɑm; *om || *om; **om || *om; *ɔm
|-
! tree
| *yin || *yin || *in
|-
! woman
| *ran; *rɑn || *ran; *rɑn || *ran; *rɑn
|-
! sky
| **xuit || *xuito || *kut
|-
! sun
| *seyɑt ||  || *sɑt
|-
! moon
| *wɑkot ||  || *wɑkot
|-
! water
| *ox || *ɔx; *óxo || *ok
|-
! fire
| *yin || *yin || 
|-
! stone
| *irop || *ero; *iro || *irop
|-
! name
| *füp; *pip || *fi || *fip; *üp
|-
! eat
| *ɑde; *en; *ɛn- || *ɑde-; *en; *ɛn- || *ɑde; *en; *en-
|-
! two
| *rumo; *rumon || *okorumon; **ok=rumɔ(n) || *irumon; *rumo
|}

Usher (2020)
Some lexical reconstructions of Proto-Digul River and lower-level reconstructions by Usher (2020) are:

{| class="wikitable sortable"
! gloss !! Proto-Digul River !! Sawuy !! Proto-North Digul !! Proto-Central Digul
|-
! head
| *kamb[e̝]jan ||  || *kabe̝jan || *kambijan
|-
! leaf/hair
| *mo̝k || moːx || *mo̝k || *mo̝k
|-
! tongue
| *te̝p || seːp ~ seɸ || *te̝p || 
|-
! skin/bark
|  ||  || *kat || *kat
|-
! breast
|  || aːm || *am || *ɒm
|-
! dog
| *tit || siːr || *tit || *tit
|-
! bird
| *ndzeːt || eːr || *dze̝t || *je̝t
|-
! egg
| *mug[o/ɔ] || mugo ||  || *mugɔ
|-
! sun/day
| *[a]tap || ataːp ||  || 
|-
! moon
| *wakɔɾ || oxaːr || *wakɔɾ || *wakɔɾ
|-
! water
|  || aːx || *[a/ɔ]k || *ɔk
|}

Evolution

Greater Awyu reflexes of proto-Trans-New Guinea (pTNG) etyma are:

Wambon language:
maŋgot ‘teeth, mouth’ < *maŋgat[a]
(Wambon S.) kodok ‘leg’ < *k(a,o)ndok[V]
mok ‘seed’ < *maŋgV
kotay ‘bark, skin’ < *(ŋg,k)a(nd,t)apu
kondok ‘bone’ < *kwanjaC
kim- ‘die’ < *kumV-
kinum- ‘sleep’ < *kin(i,u)-
ok ‘water, river’ < *okV
enop ‘fire’ < *kendop
(ko)sep ‘ashes’ < *(kambu-)sumbu
(Wambon N.) kumut ‘thunder’ < *kumut or *tumuk
ururuk ko- ‘to fly’ < *pululu

Mandobo Atas language:
am ‘breast’ < *amu
magot ‘mouth’ < *maŋgat[a]
koman ‘neck’ < *k(o,u)ma(n,ŋ)[V]
(a)moka ‘cheek’ < *mVkVm ‘cheek, jaw’
kere(top) ‘ear’ < *kand(e,i)k(V]
betit ‘fingernail’ < *mb(i,u)t(i,u)C
kodok ‘foot, leg’ < *k(a,o)ndok[V]
otae ‘bark, skin’ < *(ŋg,k)a(nd,t)apu
kiow ‘wind’ < *kumbutu
komöt ‘thunder’ < *kumut
üp ‘name’ < *imbi
kinum- ‘sleep’ < *kin(i,u)-
(ko)tep ‘ashes’ < *(kambu-)sumbu
ok ‘water, river’ < *okV
apap ‘butterfly’ < *apa(pa)ta

Pisa language:
mugo ‘egg’ < *maŋgV, kiri
mogo ‘eye’ < *kiti-maŋgV
kifi ‘wind’ < *kumbutu
ise ‘mosquito’ < *kasin
apero ‘butterfly’ < *apa(pa)ta
kunu (ri-) ‘sleep’ < *kin(i,u)-
kekuŋ- ‘carry on the shoulder’ < *kak(i,u)-

Syiaxa language:
fi ‘name’ < *imbi
apa ‘butterfly’ < *apa([pa]pata
boro ‘to fly’ < *pululu

References

Further reading
Proto-Awyu-Dumut. TransNewGuinea.org. From (1) Voorhoeve, C. L. 2000. Proto Awyu-Dumut phonology II. In A. Pawley, M. Ross, & D. Tryon (Eds.), The Boy from Bundaberg: studies in Melanesian linguistics in honour of Tom Dutton (pp. 361–381). Canberra: Pacific Linguistics. ; (2) Healey, A. 1970. Proto-Awyu-Dumut Phonology. In Wurm, S.A. and Laycock, D. C. (eds). Pacific Linguistic Studies in honour of Arthur Capell. Pacific Linguistics: Canberra.
Proto-Awyu. TransNewGuinea.org. From (1) Voorhoeve, C. L. 2000. Proto Awyu-Dumut phonology II. In A. Pawley, M. Ross, & D. Tryon (Eds.), The Boy from Bundaberg: studies in Melanesian linguistics in honour of Tom Dutton (pp. 361–381). Canberra: Pacific Linguistics. ; (2) Healey, A. 1970. Proto-Awyu-Dumut Phonology. In Wurm, S.A. and Laycock, D. C. (eds). Pacific Linguistic Studies in honour of Arthur Capell. Pacific Linguistics: Canberra.
Proto-Dumut. TransNewGuinea.org. From (1) Voorhoeve, C. L. 2000. Proto Awyu-Dumut phonology II. In A. Pawley, M. Ross, & D. Tryon (Eds.), The Boy from Bundaberg: studies in Melanesian linguistics in honour of Tom Dutton (pp. 361–381). Canberra: Pacific Linguistics. ; (2) Healey, A. 1970. Proto-Awyu-Dumut Phonology. In Wurm, S.A. and Laycock, D. C. (eds). Pacific Linguistic Studies in honour of Arthur Capell. Pacific Linguistics: Canberra.

External links
The Awyu–Ndumut languages in their linguistic and cultural context (University of Amsterdam)
 Timothy Usher, New Guinea World, Proto–Digul River – Ok
(ibid.) Proto–Digul River (see also reconstructions of North and Central Digul River)
(ibid.) Digul River. New Guinea World.

 
Languages of Indonesia
Awyu–Ok languages